Syzygium maire, swamp maire, is an evergreen tree endemic to New Zealand. It is found throughout the North Island, and the top of the South Island. Swamp maire grows in wetlands, where it develops breathing roots in waterlogged soils, but is also tolerant of reasonably dry situations. The creamy-white flowers in autumn are followed by bright red drupes around 3 cm in length in late winter. The fruit are edible and can be eaten raw or cooked. The fruits are rich in antioxidants. Swamp maire is sold for use in gardens as an ornamental plant. It is not related to other species called maire, which are in the genus Nestegis.

References

 Metcalf, Laurie, 2002. A Photographic Guide to Trees of New Zealand. Auckland: New Holland.
 Salmon, J.T., 1986. The Native Trees of New Zealand. Wellington: Heinemann Reed.

External links
 New Zealand Plant Conservation Network, Syzygium maire, accessed 2010-10-04.
 Marilyn Head, ABC Science Online, Maori plants richest in antioxidants, accessed 21 April 2008.

maire
Trees of New Zealand